Cutzamala may refer to:

Cutzamala de Pinzón, municipality and township in the state of Guerrero, Mexico
Cutzamala (Mesoamerican site), a pre-Columbian Mesoamerican archaeological site, a fortified garrison settlement in the Postclassic-era Tarascan state  
Cutzamala River, a river in the state of Guerrero, Mexico